Airport South station may refer to:

 Airport South station (Guangzhou Metro)
 Airport South metro station (Nagpur)